Bruce Eliot Maryanoff FRSC (born February 26, 1947, in Philadelphia, Pennsylvania) is an American medicinal and organic chemist.

Background and contributions
Maryanoff received a B.S. degree in chemistry in 1969, and a PhD degree in organic chemistry in 1972, both from Drexel University. From 1972 to 1974 Maryanoff was a postdoctoral fellow in the Department of Chemistry at Princeton University. He joined McNeil Laboratories, Inc., a Johnson & Johnson subsidiary, in 1974 and advanced on the scientific ladder in various Johnson & Johnson pharmaceutical units to the highest scientific position in the company. Maryanoff retired from Johnson & Johnson Pharmaceutical Research & Development, Spring House, Pennsylvania, in January 2010. He is now affiliated with The Scripps Research Institute, La Jolla, California, the Pennsylvania Drug Discovery Institute (PDDI), Doylestown, Pennsylvania, and the Baruch S. Blumberg Institute, Doylestown, Pennsylvania. He served as Associate Editor for the journal ACS Medicinal Chemistry Letters from 2009-2020. He is married to Dr. Cynthia A. Maryanoff.

Maryanoff has been active in the fields of medicinal chemistry and organic chemistry. He is an inventor of topiramate, a unique sugar sulfamate drug, which has been marketed worldwide for the treatment of epilepsy and migraine, attaining annual sales of more than $2 billion. Topiramate is also a principal component of the antiobesity drug Qsymia. Maryanoff is an internationally renowned expert in drug design and drug discovery, especially in the application of protein structure-based drug design. He made seminal contributions to understanding the stereochemistry and mechanism of the Wittig reaction; adapted the cobalt-catalyzed alkyne trimerization to the synthesis of macrocycles; and devised novel peptides that undergo self-assembly to mimic native collagen structurally and functionally. Maryanoff is an author on 280 scientific publications, including several books (editor), book chapters, and review articles. He is an inventor on 100 issued U.S. patents, has presented over 185 invited lectures worldwide, and mentored 11 postdoctoral associates. Maryanoff organized and edited a special memorial issue of the Journal of Medicinal Chemistry to honor the memory of Dr. Paul Janssen (2005) and has served on numerous editorial advisory boards for scientific journals and research grant review committees.

Awards and honors 
Johnson & Johnson's Philip B. Hofmann Research Scientist Award, 1978
23rd Achievement Award of the Philadelphia Section of the American Chemical Society (ACS), 1984
Johnson & Johnson's Philip B. Hofmann Research Scientist Award, 1987
Fellow, American Association for the Advancement of Science (AAAS), 1989
Distinguished Chemistry Alumni Award from Drexel University, 1994
Philadelphia Organic Chemists' Club (POCC) Award, 1995
Johnson & Johnson's Johnson Medal for Research and Development, 1997
Organic Syntheses Distinguished Lecture Award, Colorado State University, Department of Chemistry, 1998
Distinguished Alumni Achievement Award for Service to the Profession, Drexel University, 1999
American Chemical Society Heroes of Chemistry 2000 Award, 2000
Fellow, Royal Society of Chemistry (RSC), 2000
American Chemical Society Award in Industrial Chemistry, 2003
National Commission for Cooperative Education Co-op Hall of Fame, Class of 2002–2003.
Drexel 100, 2003
Wyeth Lecture Award, Temple University, School of Pharmacy, 2007
ACS Division of Medicinal Chemistry Hall of Fame, 2008
American Chemical Society Division of Medicinal Chemistry Edward E. Smissman Award, sponsored by Bristol-Myers Squibb, 2009
Fellow, American Chemical Society, 2009
Prix Paul Ehrlich, from Société de Chimie Thérapeutique (SCT), 2010
American Chemical Society E.B. Hershberg Award for Important Discoveries in Medicinally Active Substances, 2013

References

1947 births
Living people
21st-century American chemists
Drexel University alumni
Johnson & Johnson people
Fellows of the Royal Society of Chemistry
Fellows of the American Association for the Advancement of Science
Fellows of the American Chemical Society